Bärenschanze station is a Nuremberg U-Bahn station, located on the U1 line.

References

Nuremberg U-Bahn stations
Railway stations in Germany opened in 1980
1980 establishments in West Germany